The Scottish Premier League Golden Boot was a football award presented to the leading goalscorer at end of every season of the Scottish Premier League (SPL). The Scottish Premier League (SPL) replaced the Scottish Premier Division as the top flight of Scottish football for the 1998–99 season, but was replaced by the Scottish Premiership as the top division by the end of the 2012–13 season after the merger of the Scottish Premier League (SPL) and Scottish Football League (SFL) to form the Scottish Professional Football League (SPFL).

Winners

Awards won by nationality

Awards won by club

See also
Scottish Premier League Yearly Awards
Scottish Professional Football League yearly awards#Goalscorers

Notes

References

External links

Golden Boot
Scottish football trophies and awards
Scotland
Awards established in 1999
Awards disestablished in 2013
1999 establishments in Scotland
2013 disestablishments in Scotland